Xanthorhoe abrasaria is a moth of the family Geometridae first described by Gottlieb August Wilhelm Herrich-Schäffer in 1856. It is found in the northern part of the Palearctic realm and the Nearctic realm.

The wingspan is 21–24 mm. Adults are on wing in July. There is one generation per year.

The larvae have been recorded feeding on Galium species.

Subspecies
Xanthorhoe abrasaria abrasaria (Europe)
Xanthorhoe abrasaria congregata (Walker, 1862) (North America)
Xanthorhoe abrasaria trilineata (Warren, 1904) (North America)
Xanthorhoe abrasaria aquilonaria Cassino & Swett, 1922 (North America)

References
Skou, Peder (1986). The Geometroid Moths of North Europe (Lepidoptera, Drepanidae and Geometridae). Leiden, Kopenhagen: E.J. Brill/Scandinavian Science Press, pp. 70–71.

External links

Xanthorhoe
Palearctic Lepidoptera